The Crab is a 1917 American silent drama film directed by Walter Edwards and starring child actress Thelma Salter and actor Frank Keenan. Its production was supervised by Thomas H. Ince with distribution by Triangle Film Corporation.

Cast
Thelma Salter as Ivy Marten
Frank Keenan as Foster Borrum
Ernest Butterworth as 'Warts' Warner
Gertrude Claire as Mrs. Borrum
J. P. Lockney as Jim Owens
Tom Guise as 'Doc' Wingate (credited as Thomas Guise)
Aggie Herring as Townswoman (uncredited)

Preservation status
Prints of The Crab are preserved in the George Eastman Museum Motion Picture Collection and the French archive Centre national du cinéma et de l'image animée in Fort de Bois-d'Arcy.

References

External links

Lobby poster
Alternate theatre poster

1917 films
American silent feature films
American black-and-white films
Films directed by Walter Edwards
Silent American drama films
1917 drama films
1910s American films